The World Tour 2022 was the 14th headlining concert tour by American band Maroon 5.

Controversy
In July 2022, the band announced an Asian leg of the tour. Korean fans responded to this by telling the band that using a rising sun flag in Japan on their 2022 World Tour posters was disrespectful and controversial. Maroon 5 later removed the flag on the original poster and replaced it with a new poster featuring the members of the band on their official website.

Shows

Cancelled dates

References

Notes

Citations 

2022 concert tours
Maroon 5 concert tours